Martin J. Kilcoyne (born March 17, 1968) is the sports director at KTVI-TV FOX 2 in St. Louis, Missouri. Kilcoyne anchors the 5, 6 and 9 p.m. sportscasts on Sunday through Thursday nights.

From 2006-2010, Kilcoyne was FOX 2's play-by-play announcer for the St. Louis Rams' pre-season football games.

Kilcoyne hosts The Martin Kilcoyne Show, a weekday (12:00 PM–3:00 PM CT) talk show on St. Louis-area radio station KTRS (AM) 550.

St. Louis Magazine featured him on its 2007 "A-List." Kilcoyne was named "Best TV Sports Anchor" in St. Louis by The Riverfront Times. He won the 2008 Emmy for best Sports Anchor from the Mid-America Chapter of the National Academy of Television Arts & Sciences.

Kilcoyne returned to his hometown of St. Louis when he joined FOX 2 in 1997. Before that, his broadcasting career took him to KNAZ-TV in Flagstaff, Arizona, WJFW-TV in Rhinelander, Wisconsin, and WISC-TV in Madison, Wisconsin. He is a 1990 graduate of Marquette University in Milwaukee, Wisconsin.

References

External links 
 FOX 2 website
 

1968 births
Living people
American sports announcers
American television journalists
National Football League announcers
People from St. Louis
American sports radio personalities
American male journalists